Begoña Gómez Martín (born November 23, 1964) is a Spanish former Olympic judoka.

She was born in Madrid, Spain.  Gómez is the wife of Spanish three-time-Olympic judoka Carlos Sotillo.

Judo career
Gómez won the Spanish Judo Championship in U61 in 1984-86, 1988, 1990, and 1992.

She won the gold medal at the 1990 European Judo Championships in Frankfurt, Germany, in U61kg.

Competing for Spain at the 1992 Summer Olympics in Barcelona at the age of 27, in Judo--Women's Half-Middleweight, Gómez came in tied for 7th.

References 

Spanish female judoka
Living people
Olympic judoka of Spain
Judoka at the 1992 Summer Olympics
1964 births